"Starring the Computer" is a website that catalogs computer models that have appeared in movies. The website was started in 2008 by James Carter, a system administrator from York, UK. According to the website, the computers that are most featured in movies are the IBM AN/FSQ-7, Commodore 64, Apple II and the Burroughs B205.

See also 

 MovieCode

References

External links 

 Official website

Internet_properties_established_in_2008